General Bloomfield may refer to:

Benjamin Bloomfield, 1st Baron Bloomfield (1768–1846), British Army lieutenant general
Henry Bloomfield (politician) (c. 1798–1870), British Army lieutenant general
John Bloomfield (British Army officer) (c. 1793–1880), British Army general
Joseph Bloomfield (1753–1823), U.S. Army brigadier general

See also
Thomas Blomefield (1744–1822), British Army major general
Charles James Blomfield (Indian Army officer) (1855–1928), British Indian Army major general
Valentine Blomfield (1898–1980), British Army major general